Suspension from the Commonwealth of Nations is the most serious punishment that can be administered to members of the Commonwealth. In the absence of any mechanism by which to expel countries that breach its rules, the Commonwealth Ministerial Action Group (CMAG) may choose to suspend members from the 'Councils of the Commonwealth', which amounts to the suspension of their formal membership of the organisation, although their participation in activities of the Commonwealth Family of organisations is not necessarily affected.

Four countries have been suspended from the Commonwealth since the inception of the device in 1995: Fiji, Nigeria, Pakistan, and Zimbabwe. Pakistan has been suspended twice, Fiji three times, and Zimbabwe withdrew from the Commonwealth.

List of suspensions

Footnotes

Commonwealth of Nations